The 2019 Monaghan Senior Football Championship will be the 113th edition of Monaghan GAA's premier gaelic football tournament for senior clubs in County Monaghan, Ireland. Ten teams compete, with the winners representing Monaghan in the AIB GAA Ulster Club Senior Football Championship. The championship uses a double-elimination format for Rounds 1 and 2 before becoming knock-out.

Scotstown are the defending champions after defeating Ballybay Pearse Brothers in the 2018 final, and will be aiming for their fifth consecutive title. The 2019 competition sees the return of Doohamlet and Currin to the Senior ranks following their promotion from the Intermediate competition.

Doohamlet O'Neill's and Currin were relegated to the 2020 IFC after they finished 9th and 10th in the Monaghan SFL respectively. They'll be replaced by Magheracloone Mitchels (IFC Winners) and Donaghmoyne (IFL Winners).

Team Changes
The two bottom-placed teams in the Monaghan Senior Football League are relegated to the Intermediate ranks for the following season, with the Intermediate Football Championship winners and Intermediate Football League winners promoted in their place. If a team wins both the Intermediate Championship and League, then the next highest placed team in the League will be promoted. 

The following teams have changed division since the 2018 championship season.

To S.F.C.
Promoted from 2018 Monaghan Intermediate Football Championship
 Doohamlet O'Neills - (Championship & League winners)
 Currin St. Patricks -  (2nd in League)

From S.F.C.
Relegated to 2019 Monaghan Intermediate Football Championship
 Magheracloone Mitchells (9th in League)
 Monaghan Harps (10th in League)

Participating Teams

Preliminary round
Four of the ten teams are drawn into the preliminary round. The remaining six teams are drawn in Round 1A. The winners of the two Preliminary rounds play each other in Round 1A.

Round 1

Round 1A
The six teams not drawn in the preliminary round enter the competition in this round, along with the two Preliminary round winners (who play each other). 
The four Round 1A winners proceed to Round 2A while the four losers enter the back-door in Round 1B.

Round 1B
The losers of the preliminary round (two teams) enter this round along with the losers of Round 1A, but not that fixture which contains the preliminary round winners (three teams). A draw will be made to determine the two pairings, with the fifth team obtaining a bye into Round 2B.
Two teams will exit the competition at this stage.

The following teams are eligible to take part in Round 1B -

  Carrickmacross

  Castleblayney

  Currin

  Doohamlet

  Latton

One team will receive a bye into Round 2B.

Round 2

Round 2A
The four winners from Round 1A play each other. The two winners proceed to the semi-finals while the losers must play in Round 3.

The following teams are eligible to take part in Round 2A -

  Clontibret

  Scotstown

  Truagh 

  Ballybay

Round 2B
The two winners from Round 1B, one team who received a bye through Round 1B and the loser of the Round 1A tie involving the preliminary round winners play in this round. The winners will proceed to Round 3 while the losers will exit the championship.
The following teams are eligible to take part in Round 2B -

  Latton;

  Castleblayney;

  Carrickmacross;

  Inniskeen;

Round 3
The two winners from Round 2B play the two losers from Round 2A. The winners proceed to the semi-finals while the losers exit the championship.

The following teams are eligible to take part in Round 3 -

  Carrickmacross;

  Latton;

  Ballybay;

  Truagh;

Semifinals
The two winners from Round 2A play the two winners from Round 3.

Final

See also
 2019 AIB Ulster Club Senior Football Championship

References

Monaghan Senior Football Championship
Monaghan Senior Football Championship
Monaghan Senior Football Championship
Monaghan Senior Football Championship